Josef Kuchynka (4 August 1894 – 9 January 1979) was a Czechoslovak football manager and former player. He was also part of Czechoslovakia's squad at the 1924 Olympics, but he did not play in any matches.

A locksmith by profession, Kuchynka played as a footballer mostly for DFC Prague, a football team of ethnic Germans in Prague. In 1924 he appeared in one Czechoslovakia national team match, playing against Yugoslavia in Zagreb. During World War II, Kuchynka coached Sparta Prague. After the war, he coached SK Slezská Ostrava from 1946 to 1948. After the communist takeover of power in February 1948, he was forbidden to work as a professional football manager and was supposed to work in a coal mine. He decided to leave Czechoslovakia and later worked in Poland, coaching Wisła Kraków in 1948–1950. He returned to Czechoslovakia in his retirement age.

Footnotes

References
  
 Trenéři v celé historii Sparty at the Sparta Prague website 

1894 births
1979 deaths
Czechoslovak footballers
Czechoslovakia international footballers
Czechoslovak football managers
Czechoslovak expatriate football managers
FC Baník Ostrava managers
Wisła Kraków managers
AC Sparta Prague managers
Czechoslovak expatriate sportspeople in Poland
Expatriate football managers in Poland
SK Kladno managers
FC Fastav Zlín managers
FC Zbrojovka Brno managers
MŠK Žilina managers
Association football defenders
Footballers from Prague
People from the Kingdom of Bohemia
Olympic footballers of Czechoslovakia
Footballers at the 1924 Summer Olympics
German Bohemian people
DFC Prag players